Devon K. Shepard is an American television writer and producer. His television credits, include Weeds, Everybody Hates Chris, One on One, All About the Andersons, Cedric the Entertainer Presents, The Wayans Bros., MADtv, The Fresh Prince of Bel-Air, Crash and among other series.

References

External links
 
 

American television producers
American television writers
American male television writers
Living people
Place of birth missing (living people)
Year of birth missing (living people)